Lee Joon-hyuk may refer to:

 Lee Jun-hyeok (actor, born 1972), South Korean actor
 Lee Joon-hyuk (actor, born 1984), South Korean actor
 Lee Jun-hyuk (footballer), South Korean footballer